Dan Fallows is a British Formula One aerodynamicist. He is currently the technical director of the Aston Martin Formula One team, having previously served as head of aerodynamics at the Red Bull team.

Biography

Fallows started his career in F1  when he was recruited in 2002 by Jaguar Racing as a senior aerodynamicist. However, when Ford announced its decision to stop its  involvement in Formula 1, he moved to Italian chassis builder Dallara.
In 2006 Fallows returned to the Milton Keynes outfit, which had now become Red Bull Racing, where he took on the role of team leader in the aerodynamics department, helping the team to its first podiums, victories and ultimately to eight world titles in four years between 2010 and 2013.
In 2014 he stepped up to become Head of Aerodynamics and subsequently helped shape the team's progress through F1's hybrid era. On 25 June 2021, it was announced that Fallows had agreed a contract with Aston Martin Formula One team, to commence on 2 April 2022.

References

1973 births
Living people
Formula One designers
British motorsport designers
21st-century British engineers
Red Bull Racing